Chatfield State Park is a state park located in Douglas and Jefferson counties of Colorado, United States. The park centers on Chatfield Reservoir, a 1,423 acre surface area lake fed by the South Platte River and two other creeks, including Plum Creek.

Reservoir Expansion Project

The project involved moving some of the surrounding park's facilities back from the new, higher lake levels.

Wildlife
Over three hundred bird species both migrant and resident frequent Chatfield. Also a variety of mammals roam the park, including whitetail and mule deer, coyote, red fox, cottontail rabbit, prairie dogs and weasels.

Audubon Center at Chatfield State Park

The Audubon Society of Greater Denver operates the Audubon Center at Chatfield State Park, a nature education center that offers classes, workshops and lectures for all ages, with an emphasis on children and families.

The center's facilities were originally part of a  ranch for the Atchison family that became the headquarters for the Glenn L. Martin Company in 1955.  The land became part of the Chatfield Dam construction project after a flood in 1965, and later became Chatfield State Park.  The Audubon Society of Greater Denver was invited by Colorado State Parks to develop a nature center in 1998 out of the old 1940s ranch buildings.  In 2004 the Society completed the renovation of the stone garage building into an outdoor learning lab.  In 2006 the stone farmhouse was rehabilitated for classroom space and an outdoor amphitheater was constructed.  The Society is building a visitor center that will house natural history exhibits, a nature library, an auditorium and a nature-based preschool.

References

External links

 Official website
 Audubon Center at Chatfield State Park - Audubon Society of Greater Denver
 Chatfield Storage Reallocation Project website

State parks of Colorado
Protected areas of Douglas County, Colorado
Protected areas of Jefferson County, Colorado
Nature centers in Colorado
National Audubon Society
Protected areas established in 1975
Education in Jefferson County, Colorado
1975 establishments in Colorado